Buddleja suaveolens is endemic to central Chile, growing mostly in rocky areas along rivers at elevations of 500 – 2,900 m. The species was first named and described by Kunth and Bouché in 1845.

Description
Buddleja suaveolens is a dioecious shrub 1 – 4 m tall, with grey fissured bark and persistent dead naked branches. The young branches are yellow, terete and tomentulose, bearing small sessile, elliptic to oblong subcoriaceous leaves, 0.5 – 3 cm long by 0.2 – 1 cm wide, glabrescent above but tomentose below. The yellowish orange leafy inflorescences comprise one terminal and 2 – 7 pairs of heads in the axils of the upper leaves, each head approximately 1 cm in diameter, with 6 – 20 flowers; the corollas 5 mm long.

The species is considered to be closely related to B. mendozensis.

Cultivation
The species is not known to be in cultivation.

References

suaveolens
Flora of Chile
Flora of South America
Dioecious plants